Coquille River Light (formerly known as Bandon Light) is a lighthouse located near Bandon, Oregon, United States. It is currently maintained by the Oregon Parks and Recreation Department as a part of Bullards Beach State Park.

History
Originally named Bandon Light, Coquille River Light was commissioned in 1895. First lit on February 29, 1896, the light guided mariners past the dangerous shifting sandbars into the Coquille River and harbor at Bandon. The light contained a fourth-order Fresnel lens and connected to the nearby keepers house by a wooden walkway. In September 1936, a large wildfire swept through the surrounding area, and destroyed most of Bandon. The town soon became bankrupt as a result of the decline in shipping. Coquille Light was shut down in 1939 and replaced by an automated light on the south jetty.

The light was originally built with a Daboll trumpet for its foghorn, which was used as the light's fog signal for several years. However, at certain times due to specific weather conditions, the sound of the trumpet would fail at sea, and in 1910 the trumpet was replaced by a more reliable fog siren. While mariners liked the new signal, many Bandon residents did not. The siren would eventually be removed along with the Fresnel lens after the light's decommissioning.

Over the next 37 years, the condition of the light deteriorated due to neglect and vandalism, until 1976, when its first major restoration began. However, by this time, the keepers quarters and other outbuildings had deteriorated past the point of repair, and were eventually removed. In 1991, a new solar powered light was installed in the tower. Currently, a new set of renovations are being done to the light as an ongoing project, and is estimated to finish sometime in 2011.

See also

 List of lighthouses on the Oregon Coast
 Steamboats of the Coquille River
 List of Oregon shipwrecks

References

External links
 

Lighthouses completed in 1895
Oregon Coast
Lighthouses on the National Register of Historic Places in Oregon
Transportation buildings and structures in Coos County, Oregon
Tourist attractions in Coos County, Oregon
National Register of Historic Places in Coos County, Oregon